McCalla is a surname. Notable people with the surname include:

Bowman H. McCalla, officer in the U.S. Navy
Deidre McCalla, American musician
Irish McCalla, actress and pinup girl
LaDouphyous McCalla, American football player
Leyla McCalla, American musician
Noel McCalla, current lead singer for Manfred Mann's Earth Band
Val McCalla, British newspaper publisher
William McCalla, Irish botanist

See also
USS McCalla, two ships
McCalla, Alabama, town in the United States
McCalla Field, Auxiliary landing airfield, in Guantanamo Bay, Cuba
McCall (disambiguation)